The men's 4 km team pursuit cycling event at the 1984 Summer Olympics took place from 2 to 3 August and was one of eight cycling events at the 1984 Olympics. The qualification and quarter finals were on 2 August and the semi finals and finals on 3 August.

Results

Qualification

Quarter finals
Heat 1

Heat 2

Heat 3

Heat 4

Semi finals
Heat 1

Heat 2

Final
Bronze medal

Gold medal

References

Cycling at the 1984 Summer Olympics
Cycling at the Summer Olympics – Men's team pursuit
Track cycling at the 1984 Summer Olympics